Mount Hancock el.  is an isolated mountain peak on Big Game Ridge in Yellowstone National Park.  Captain John W. Barlow named the peak in honor of General Winfield Scott Hancock during the Barlow-Heap Exploration of Yellowstone in 1871.  General Hancock is noted for issuing the orders that established the military escort led by Lt. Gustavus Cheyney Doane for the Washburn–Langford–Doane Expedition of 1870.

Big Game Ridge is a precipitous north-south ridge due south of Heart Lake on the park's southern border.

See also
 Mountains and mountain ranges of Yellowstone National Park

Notes

Mountains of Wyoming
Mountains of Yellowstone National Park
Mountains of Teton County, Wyoming